Silphiodaucus prutenicus is a species of flowering plant belonging to the family Apiaceae.

Its native range is Central, Eastern and Southern Europe.

Synonym:
 Laserpitium prutenicum L.

References

Apiaceae